Kerstersia similis  is a gram-negative bacterium of the genus of Kerstersia which was isolated from human clinical samples.

References

External links
Type strain of Kerstersia similis at BacDive -  the Bacterial Diversity Metadatabase

Burkholderiales
Bacteria described in 2012